The Marianna Brickeys were a minor league baseball team based in Marianna, Arkansas. In 1909, the Brickeys played as members of the Northeast Arkansas League, finishing in third place in their only season of minor league play.

History 
Minor league baseball began in Marianna, Arkansas when the "Marianna Brickeys" began play in 1909. Marianna became charter members of the reformed Class D level Northeast Arkansas League, which began play as a four–team league. The Northeast Arkansas League was formed after the Arkansas State League folded on July 27, 1909. With the Northeast Arkansas League beginning play on July 26, 1909, the Marianna Brickeys joined the Jonesboro Zebras, Newport Pearl Diggers and Paragould Scouts as charter members.

The Marianna use of the "Brickeys" nickname corresponds to the City of Marianna bricking the city streets in 1908.

In the final 1909 overall standings, Marianna placed third, playing the season under player/manager Jack McAdams. McAdams and Marianna teammate Wild Bill Luhrsen had played together earlier in the season for the Argenta Shamrocks of the Arkansas State League. In August, Luhrsen threw a shutout against the Paragould Scouts. The Marianna Brickeys ended the season with a 24–29 record in their first season of play, finishing 6.5 games behind the first place Jonesboro Zebras (30–23). The Marianna Brickeys followed the second place Newport Pearl Diggers (29–25) and finished ahead of the Paragould Scouts (24–30) in the final standings.

The Marianna franchise did not return to play in the 1910 Northeast Arkansas League. Marianna, Arkansas has not hosted another minor league team.

The ballpark
The name and location of the Marianna Brickeys' home ballpark is unknown.

Year–by–year record

Notable alumni

Wild Bill Luhrsen (1909)
Jack McAdams (1909, MGR)

See also
Marianna Brickeys players

References

External links
Marianna - Baseball Reference

Defunct minor league baseball teams
Professional baseball teams in Arkansas
Defunct baseball teams in Arkansas
Baseball teams established in 1909
Baseball teams disestablished in 1909
Northeast Arkansas League teams
Lee County, Arkansas